Agnipareeksha Jeevan Ki – Gangaa (English: Fire – Purification Test Of Life – Gangaa) is an Indian television series which premiered on Colors on 15 February 2010.

Plot
The show is based on the life of a young village girl named Gangaa who is considered cursed by her superstitious neighbours because she has some white scars on her hands. The fact, as revealed later, is that her hand was burnt in her previous birth on the day she had married the head priest, Harshvardhan (called Mahant ji) in Rajgarh village.

In her present birth, Gangaa's stepmother and her brother try to get her married to an evil man named Jeevan so that they can get rid of her. Shiv, who is Gangaa's good friend, wants to save her from Jeevan and takes her to his village Rajgarh. During the journey they are attacked by Jeevan and his hooligans. Shiv saves Gangaa and ends up falling in love with her. He takes Gangaa to his adoptive brother Harshvardhan, the head priest or Mahant of Rajgarh. When Gangaa meets Harshvardhan, memories of her past life are revived. Eventually, Harshvardhan also recognizes her as his dead wife who has been reborn.

Cast
 Jayshree Soni as Gangaa
 Vivian Dsena as Shivam
 Tarun Khanna as Harshvardhan (Mahant Ji)
 Amrapali Gupta as Vedika
 Surendra Pal
 Zeb Khan

References

Colors TV original programming
Indian drama television series
2010 Indian television series debuts
2010 Indian television series endings